Google phone may refer to:

Any phone running Google's Android operating system
Phones that were manufactured or co-manufactured with Google, including:
Android Dev Phones:
HTC Dream, an HTC-manufactured Android developer smartphone, released December 2008
HTC Magic, an HTC-manufactured Android developer smartphone, released November 2009
One of the phones of the Google Nexus family:
Nexus One, an HTC-manufactured smartphone, released January 2010
Nexus S, Samsung-manufactured successor to the Nexus One, released December 2010
Galaxy Nexus, Samsung-manufactured successor to the Nexus S, released November 2011
Nexus 4, LG-manufactured successor to the Galaxy Nexus, released November 2012
Nexus 5, LG-manufactured successor to the Nexus 4, released November 2013
Nexus 6, Motorola-manufactured successor to the Nexus 5, released November 2014
Nexus 5X, LG-manufactured successor to the Nexus 5, released October 2015
Nexus 6P, Huawei-manufactured successor to the Nexus 6, released September 2015
One of the phones of the Google Pixel family:
Pixel, released 2016
Pixel 2, released 2017
Pixel 3, released 2018
Pixel 3a, released 2019
Pixel 4, released 2019
Pixel 4a, released 2020
Pixel 5, released 2020
Pixel 5a, released in 2021
Pixel 6, released in 2021
Pixel 6a, released in 2022
Pixel 7, released in 2022